Faʻafafine are people who identify themselves as having a third gender or non-binary role in Samoa, American Samoa and the Samoan diaspora. A recognised gender identity/gender role in traditional Samoan society, and an integral part of Samoan culture, faʻafafine are assigned male at birth, and explicitly embody both masculine and feminine gender traits in a way unique to Polynesia. Their behaviour typically ranges from extravagantly feminine to conventionally masculine.

Anthropologists have speculated that if a Samoan family had more boys than girls or not enough girls to help with women's duties about the house, male children would be chosen to be raised as faʻafafine, however, this theory has been disputed.

It has been estimated that 1–5% of Samoans identify as faʻafafine. According to SBS news, there are up to 3,000 faʻafafine currently living in Samoa.

History and terminology 
The word faʻafafine includes the causative prefix faʻa–, meaning "in the manner of", and the word fafine, meaning "woman". A person assigned female at birth may belong to a masculine third gender, faʻatane, faʻatama, and fafatama. Ultimately, Western terms like gay and transgender overlap but do not align exactly with Samoan gender terms found in the traditional culture of Samoa.

The Samoan slang word mala (devastation) is a less-common term for faʻafafine, originating in fundamentalist-influenced homophobia and transphobia.

Strong evidence points to Samoa being under matriarchal rule for centuries before contact with Europeans. Queen Salamasina, holder of four paramount chief titles, ascended the throne in the 16th century through the shrewd maneuvering of the powerful female chieftains around her. Samoa continues to value the leadership roles of women and third gender people. There is no restriction on the transfer of chiefly titles to women or fa'afafine, and there is a healthy list of past and present faʻafafine chiefs.

The history of faʻafafine is difficult to trace. Nafanua, the female warrior and chief of Samoan early history, is often held up as an icon of faʻafafine and faʻatane. In Dolgoy's recorded interviews with faʻafafine from the 1980s, we know that Johnny Fruitcake was a popular faʻafafine during the American military occupation of American Samoa in World War II, and that Anita (Tony Schwenke) was the founder of Hollywood, a tailoring shop and house of refuge for faʻafafine in Apia in the 1960s–1970s. Since the 1980s, the Samoan diaspora has given faʻafafine a higher profile outside Samoa.

The existence of faʻafafine could be accounted for by a gene that directs kin-directed altruism, which proposes that androphilia could be passed down because it is societally advantageous to have non traditional roles.  Paul L. Vasey contends that the existence of androphilia may serve the evolutionary purpose of providing avunculate support for related kin. This means that families that include faʻafafine and members in other non traditional roles, such as unmarried aunts and uncles, would have more time and resources to dedicate to the success of their kin. Freedom from the constraints of a traditional marriage and the raising of children allows faʻafafine to excel in nurturing the family and community dynamics. This fits nicely in Samoan society where hierarchy is highly stratified and customs are strictly adhered to.

Role in Samoan society 
The existence of a third gender is so well-accepted in Samoan culture that most Samoans state that they have friendships with at least one faʻafafine;. However, faʻafafine are not fully accepted in all parts of the community, such as by some Catholic groups and traditional leaders. 

Faʻafafine are known for their hard work and dedication to the family, in the Samoan tradition of tautua or service to family. Ideas of the family in Samoa and Polynesia include all the members of a sa, or communal family within the faʻamatai family system. Traditionally, faʻafafine follow the training of the women's daily work in an aiga (Samoan family group).  Faʻafafine state that they "loved" engaging in feminine activities as children, such as playing with female peers, playing female characters during role play, dressing in feminine clothes, and playing with female gender-typical toys. This is in contrast to women who stated that they merely "liked" engaging in those activities as children. Some faʻafafine recall believing they were girls in childhood. In Samoa, there is very seldom ridicule or displeasure towards a biologically male child who states that they are a girl. One study showed only a minority of parents (20 per cent) tried to stop their faʻafafine children from engaging in feminine behaviour. Being pushed into the male gender role is upsetting to many faʻafafine. A significant number stated that they "hated" masculine play, such as rough games and sports, even more than females did as children.

Faʻafafine have sexual relationships exclusively with men who do not identify as faʻafafine.

Society of Faʻafafine in American Samoa and the Samoa Faʻafafine Association
It fosters collaboration between faʻafafine and LGBTQI+ communities in American Samoa, the Asia Pacific region, and the world. The Miss SOFIAS pagaent has been held in Pago Pago, American Samoa, since 1979.

The Samoa Fa'afafine Association (SFA), based in Apia, was founded in 2006. It works closely with government, churches, and youth organisations, supporting community projects for the fa'afafine community, but also for elders and youth in Samoa. SFA is also active on the international level, working with the United Nations and Pacific regional NGOs, on behalf of the faʻafafine, transgender, and LGBT communities of the Pacific Islands. They also work with media organisations to promote a equitable representation of faʻafafine.

The SFA, with fa'afafine lawyers Alex Suʻa and Phineas Hartson Matautia, have initiated legislative activity on issues of LGBT rights in Samoa. Their efforts to repeal homophobic and transphobic laws inherited from the British and New Zealand colonial administrations have met with partial success. Same-sex marriage for faʻafafine is still unlawful in Samoa, and despite legalisation in the U.S., it is still not recognised in the US Territory of American Samoa.

Notable Faʻafafine
 Edward Cowley a.k.a. "Buckwheat" – a drag performer and television personality based in Auckland, worked with New Zealand AIDS Foundation, champion bodybuilder.
 Shigeyuki Kihara – a contemporary artist whose work has been featured in numerous museum exhibitions art galleries around the world. Her solo exhibition, Shigeyuki Kihara: Living Photographs (2008–9), was the Metropolitan Museum of Art's first exhibition of contemporary Samoan art. Kihara is co-Editor of the 2018 book Samoan Queer Lives.
 Marion Malena – a multiple beauty pageant winner and performer from American Samoa currently living in Seattle. She hosts American Samoa: Through the Years.
 Fuimaono Karl Pulotu-Endemann – a medical professional, Justice of the Peace, and gay activist from New Zealand. In the 2001 New Year Honours, Pulotu-Endemann was made a Member of the New Zealand Order of Merit for services to Public Health.
 Jaiyah Saelua – American Samoan soccer player. Saelua was the first faʻafafine player to compete in a men's FIFA World Cup qualifier. Saelua featured in a UK documentary Next Goal Wins.
 Dan Taulapapa McMullin – poet, painter, filmmaker. Exhibited at Bishop Museum, Metropolitan Museum, United Nations. Collection of poems: Coconut Milk (American Library Association Top Ten LGBT Books of the Year).
 Amao Leota Lu – performance artist, activist, community leader

Fictional Faʻafafine
 half-man half-girl, an unnamed character in Albert Wendt's novel Flying Fox in a Freedom Tree (1979)
 Muli and Pipi, in Dan Taulapapa McMullin's poem The Bat (1993) which received a Poets&Writers Award
 Sugar Shirley, a character in Sia Figiel's novel Where We Once Belonged (1996)
'Vili Atafa, a character in the Pasifika play A Frigate Bird Sings (1996) by Oscar Kightley, David Fane and Nathaniel Lees
 Sinalela (2001), a fictional character in the short film Sinalela by Dan Taulapapa McMullin, awarded Best Short Film in the Honolulu Rainbow Film Festival
 Faafafine (2001), an autobiographical solo performance piece by Brian Fuata
 Brother Ken in bro'Town (2004-2009), a school principal
 Jerry the Faʻafafine (2011), a thematic figure (influenced by the poetry of Taulapapa) in an artwork series by Tanu Gago

See also
 Bakla (binabae) – equivalent gender identity in the Philippines
 Takatāpui – homosexual or bisexual relationships among the Māori
 Moe aikāne – homosexual or bisexual relationships among Native Hawaiians
 Two-spirit – similar gender identity in Native American culture
 Hijra – similar gender identity in South Asia
 Kathoey – similar gender identity in Thailand

References

Citations

Sources
 Dolgoy, Reevan. 2000. The Search for Recognition and Social Movement Emergence, Towards an Understanding of the Transformation of the Faafafine of Samoa. (From interviews of the 1970s, 1980s, 1990s). University of Alberta.
 Schmidt, Johanna. 2001. "Redefining Faʻafafine: Western Discourses and the Construction of Transgenderism in Samoa". Intersections, Issue 6.
 Taulapapa McMullin, Dan. 2004. A Drag Queen Named Pipi. Tinfish Press, Honolulu.
 Vanessa, Taliga Dr. Venasio Sele. 2008. Memoirs of a Samoan, Catholic, and Fa'afafine.
 Feuʻu, Poiva Junior Ashleigh. 2013.  Ia e Ola Malamalama i lou Faasinomaga, A Comparative Study of the Faafafine of Samoa and the Whakawahine of Aotearoa-New Zealand. Victoria University of Wellington.
 Taulapapa McMullin, Dan. 2013.  Coconut Milk.  University of Arizona Press.
 Thompson, Pausa Kaio. 2017. Saili Le Tofa: A Search for New Wisdom: Sexuality and Faʻafafine in the Samoan Context. Columbia University.
 Kihara, Yuki, and Taulapapa McMullin, Dan. 2018. "Samoan Queer Lives". Little Island Press, Auckland, Aotearoa-New Zealand.

External links
 Facebook page for S.F.A. Samoan Faafafine Association Incorporated, Apia, Samoa.
 Official website of S.O.F.I.A.S. Society of Faʻafaafine in American Samoa, Pago Pago, American Samoa.
 Facebook page for UTOPIA San Francisco.
 Montague, James. 2011. "Transgender Player Helps American Samoa to First International Soccer Win". New York Times, November 25, 2011.

 
Gender in Oceania
Gender systems
Samoan culture
Third gender
Transgender in Oceania
Society of Samoa
Samoan words and phrases
American Samoan culture
LGBT in Samoa
LGBT in American Samoa
Indigenous LGBT culture